Robert Douglas (1727–1809) was a Scottish-born soldier who was commander of the garrison city of 's-Hertogenbosch in the Netherlands   from 1780 to 1794. He was governor there from 1784.

Douglas was a major-general from 1778, and replaced Ludwig Ernst von Brunswick-Lüneburg-Bevern at 's-Hertogenbosch. He was the son of George Douglas of Friarshaw and his wife, Elizabeth Scott (daughter of Sir Patrick Scott, Bart. of Ancrum). His grandfather was Henry Douglas, 6th laird of Friarshaw.

Notes

External links 
noordbrabantsmuseum.nl

1727 births
1809 deaths
Scottish generals
18th century in the Dutch Republic
Military history of the Dutch Republic
People of the Patriottentijd
Scottish expatriates in the Netherlands
Scottish mercenaries
18th-century Scottish people